Inverhuron Provincial Park is a provincial park located on the shores of Lake Huron beside the small village of Inverhuron, Ontario, near Tiverton, Ontario, Canada. The park opened in 1956.

With the construction of a heavy water "deuterium oxide" plant at the Bruce Nuclear Power Development, Ontario Hydro purchased the park from the Ministry of Natural Resources in 1973 for issues of safety and security.

See also
List of Ontario Parks

References

External links

Provincial parks of Ontario
Parks in Bruce County
Protected areas established in 1956
1956 establishments in Ontario
Campsites in Canada
Lake Huron